AOG may refer to:

152d Air Operations Group, a unit of the New York Air National Guard
Abscisate beta-glucosyltransferase, an enzyme
Aircraft on ground, an aviation term
Anshan Teng'ao Airport, IATA code AOG
AOG desk, a dedicated aviation logistics service
Adventures of God, a Belgian webtoon series
Army of God (United States), a Christian terrorist organization in the United States
Assemblies of God
Australian Christian Churches
Assemblies of God in Great Britain
Appellation d'Origine Garantie, fourteen wine-producing regions of Morocco
Association of Graduates for the United States Military Academy
Hull designation for Mettawee-class gasoline tankers